Selenium tetrafluoride (SeF4) is an inorganic compound. It is a colourless liquid that reacts readily with water. It can be used as a fluorinating reagent in organic syntheses (fluorination of alcohols, carboxylic acids or carbonyl compounds) and has advantages over sulfur tetrafluoride in that milder conditions can be employed and it is a liquid rather than a gas.

Synthesis
The first reported synthesis of selenium tetrafluoride was by Paul Lebeau in 1907, who treated selenium with fluorine:
Se  +  2 F2   →   SeF4
A synthesis involving more easily handled reagents entails the fluorination of selenium dioxide with sulfur tetrafluoride:
SF4 + SeO2 → SeF4 + SO2
An intermediate in this reaction is seleninyl fluoride (SeOF2).

Other methods of preparation include fluorinating elemental selenium with chlorine trifluoride:
3 Se + 4 ClF3 → 3 SeF4 + 2 Cl2

Structure and bonding
Selenium in SeF4 has an oxidation state of +4. Its shape in the gaseous phase is similar to that of SF4, having a see-saw shape. VSEPR theory predicts a pseudo-trigonal pyramidal disposition of the five electron pairs around the selenium atom. The axial Se-F bonds are 177 pm with an F-Se-F bond angle of 169.2°. The two other fluorine atoms are attached by shorter bonds (168 pm), with an F-Se-F bond angle of 100.6°. In solution at low concentrations this monomeric structure predominates, but at higher concentrations evidence suggests weak association between SeF4 molecules leading to a distorted octahedral coordination around the selenium atom. In the solid the selenium center also has a distorted octahedral environment.

Reactions
In HF, SeF4 behaves as a weak base, weaker than sulfur tetrafluoride, SF4 (Kb= 2 X 10−2):
SeF4 + HF → SeF3+ + HF2−; (Kb = 4 X 10−4)

Ionic adducts containing the SeF3+ cation are formed with SbF5, AsF5, NbF5, TaF5, and BF3.
With caesium fluoride, CsF, the SeF5− anion is formed, which has a square pyramidal structure similar to the isoelectronic chlorine pentafluoride, ClF5 and bromine pentafluoride, BrF5.
With 1,1,3,3,5,5-hexamethylpiperidinium fluoride or 1,2-dimethylpropyltrimethylammonium fluoride, the SeF62− anion is formed. This has a distorted octahedral shape which contrasts to the regular octahedral shape of the analogous SeCl62−.

References

 Selenium: Inorganic Chemistry Krebs. B., Bonmann S., Eidenschink I.; Encyclopedia of Inorganic Chemistry (1994) John Wiley and Sons

See also
Selenium hexafluoride
Sulfur tetrafluoride
Tellurium tetrafluoride

External links
 WebBook page for SeF4

Fluorides
Selenium(IV) compounds
Fluorinating agents
Chalcohalides
Substances discovered in the 1900s